Events in the year 1415 in Portugal.

Incumbents
King: John I

Events
Conquest of Ceuta
Creation of the Dukedom of Viseu

Deaths
 18 July - Philippa of Lancaster, Queen of Portugal
Beatriz Pereira de Alvim, noblewoman

See also
History of Portugal (1279–1415)
History of Portugal (1415–1578)

References

 
Portugal
Years of the 15th century in Portugal
Portugal